Dubach is a surname. Notable people with the surname include:

Alexandre Dubach (born 1955), Swiss violinist
Ernst Dubach (1881–1982), Swiss racing cyclist